Union Township is one of the twelve townships of Miami County, Ohio, United States.  The 2000 census found 10,222 people in the township, 4,673 of whom lived in the unincorporated portions of the township.

Geography
Located in the southwestern corner of the county, it borders the following townships:
Newton Township - north
Concord Township - northeast
Monroe Township - east
Clayton - southeast
Clay Township, Montgomery County - southwest
Monroe Township, Darke County - west
Franklin Township, Darke County - northwest corner

Several populated places are located in Union Township:
Laura, a village in the northwest
Ludlow Falls, a village in the north
Potsdam, a village in the west
Part of Union, a city in the southeast
West Milton, a village in the center

Name and history
It is one of twenty-seven Union Townships statewide.

Government
The township is governed by a three-member board of trustees, who are elected in November of odd-numbered years to a four-year term beginning on the following January 1. Two are elected in the year after the presidential election and one is elected in the year before it. There is also an elected township fiscal officer, who serves a four-year term beginning on April 1 of the year after the election, which is held in November of the year before the presidential election. Vacancies in the fiscal officership or on the board of trustees are filled by the remaining trustees.

Education
Milton-Union High School serves the township (which has a unified school district).

References

External links
County website

Townships in Miami County, Ohio
Townships in Ohio